Kahn-e Rasul Bakhsh (also Romanized as Kahn-e Rasūl Bakhsh; also known as Qanāt-e Rasūl Bakhsh) is a village in Zaboli Rural District, in the Central District of Mehrestan County, Sistan and Baluchestan Province, Iran. At the 2006 census, its population was 188, in 36 families.

References 

Populated places in Mehrestan County